For each may refer to:
 In mathematics, Universal quantification. Also read as: "for all"
 In computer science, foreach loop

See also
Each (disambiguation)